Chris Taylor may refer to:

Music 

 Chris Taylor (Christian rock musician), American singer-songwriter
 Chris Taylor (Grizzly Bear musician) (born 1981), American musician and producer with the band Grizzly Bear
 Chris Taylor (music producer), American pioneering West Coast DJ, a/k/a "The Glove"

Sports 
 Chris Taylor (American football) (born 1983), American running back in the NFL, primarily for the Houston Texans
 Chris Taylor (baseball) (born 1990), American baseball player
 Chris Taylor (cricketer, born 1976), English cricketer, who has played for Gloucestershire
 Chris Taylor (cricketer, born 1981), English cricketer, who has played for Yorkshire and Derbyshire
 Chris Taylor (footballer, born 1899) (1899–1972), English football player for Manchester United
 Chris Taylor (footballer, born 1985), English football player for Swindon Town
 Chris Taylor (footballer, born 1986), English football player for Barrow
 Chris Taylor (ice hockey) (born 1972), Canadian NHL player for the Buffalo Sabres
 Chris Taylor (rowing) (born 1966), Canadian Olympic rower
 Chris Taylor (wrestler) (1950–1979), American freestyle wrestler

Other

 Chris Taylor, character played by Charlie Sheen in the movie Platoon
 Chris Taylor (attorney), owner of TMKO Lawyers & Last Gang Records
 Chris Taylor (comedian) (born 1974), known for The Chaser's War on Everything, CNNNN, and Triple J
 Chris Taylor (engineer) (born 1943), engineer and Vice-Chancellor of the University of Bradford
 Chris Taylor (video game designer), known for Total Annihilation and Dungeon Siege
 Chris Taylor (politician) (born 1968), Democratic member of the Wisconsin State Assembly

See also 

 Christopher Taylor (disambiguation)
 Christopher Taylor (game designer), known for Fallout
 Christian Taylor (disambiguation)